Kongad is a town and gram panchayat in Palakkad taluk, Kerala, India.It is a local government organisation that serves the villages of Kongad-I and Kongad-II.Kongad is located about 18 km from the district headquarters Palakkad.

References 

Gram panchayats in Palakkad district